The Letrero Formation is a Late Miocene (Mayoan to Montehermosan in the SALMA classification) geologic formation in south-central Ecuador. The formation comprises lacustrine sediments with strong fluvial clastic input and contains siltstones and fine-grained sandstones.

Fossil content 
The formation has provided fossils of:
 Anadasypus aequatorianus
 Caviomorpha indet.
 Litopterna indet.
 Toxodontia indet.

See also 
 List of fossiliferous stratigraphic units in Ecuador

References

Bibliography 
 

Geologic formations of Ecuador
Miocene Series of South America
Neogene Ecuador
Messinian
Tortonian
Chasicoan
Mayoan
Montehermosan
Siltstone formations
Sandstone formations
Lacustrine deposits
Fluvial deposits
Paleontology in Ecuador
Formations